Picpus (Courteline) is a station on Line 6 of the Paris Métro in the 12th arrondissement. The station is located under the Avenue de Saint-Mandé, to the west of the crossroads with the Boulevard de Picpus. There is a single entrance and exit, located on the southern side of the Avenue de Saint-Mandé.

History
The station was opened on 1 March 1909 as Saint-Mandé with the extension of the line from Place d'Italie to Nation. It is named after the district of Picpus and the Boulevard de Picpus. It was renamed Picpus on 1 March 1937 to avoid confusion with Saint-Mandé on Line 1. The station has the additional name of Courteline, after author Georges Courteline (1858–1929). It was the location of the Barrière de Saint-Mandé, a gate built for the collection of taxation as part of the Wall of the Farmers-General; the gate was built between 1784 and 1788 and demolished in the 19th century.

Places of interest
Square Courteline
Picpus Cemetery, where, in particular, General La Fayette is buried
Church of l'Immaculée Conception

Station layout

References

Paris Métro stations in the 12th arrondissement of Paris
Railway stations in France opened in 1909